Super flyweight, also referred to as junior bantamweight, is a weight class in professional boxing, contested from  and up to .

History
The first title match in this division was in 1980, when the World Boxing Council responded to pressure from Asian and Latin American members who felt the difference between the flyweight limit and the bantamweight limit was too significant.  Rafael Orono won the inaugural title in February of that year by defeating Seung-Hoon Lee.  The World Boxing Association followed suit in 1981 when Gustavo Ballas won the vacant title by knocking out Sok-Chul Baek.  The first International Boxing Federation champion was Ju-Do Chun, who won the belt in 1983 with a knockout of Ken Kasugai.

Notable champions in this division have been Ellyas Pical, Gilberto Román, Jiro Watanabe, Moon Sung-kil, Nana Konadu, Mark Johnson, Johnny Tapia, Robert Quiroga, Danny Romero, Vic Darchinyan, Khaosai Galaxy, Samson Dutch Boy Gym, Nonito Donaire, Román González, Carlos Cuadras, Tepparith Singwancha, Naoya  Inoue, McJoe Arroyo, Juan Francisco Estrada and Srisaket Sor Rungvisai.

Khaosai Galaxy holds the record for most consecutive title defenses at this division, with 19 defenses of the WBA title.

Current world champions

Current The Ring world rankings

As of December 10, 2022.

Keys:
 Current The Ring world champion

References

Flyweight

fr:Poids coqs